Shim Hwa-jin (born December 24, 1956) is a South Korean academic specialising in the history of clothing and textiles. She was president of Sungshin Women's University from 2007 until 2017, when she was imprisoned for embezzlement.

Biography
Shim is the fourth daughter of chairman Shim Young-hyun, and granddaughter of Sungshin Women's University's founder Li Suk-jeong. She graduated from the Department of Clothing at Konkuk University, then completed her PhD at Sungshin Women's University, after which she became a lecturer there.

Career
Shim became 8th president of Sungshin Women's University in 2007 and continued on as 9th and 10th president.

Legal case
After her reappointment as president for the third term, four members of the university's student association raised concerns that Shim had embezzled funds from the school, which led to their suspension in January 2016. The students successfully pursued a court case to have the suspension overturned, and it was struck down in October. Meanwhile, investigative journalists found that a prominent individual's daughter had been admitted to Sungshin after cheating in the assessment, in addition to a relative of Shim's being appointed as a tenure-track lecturer on the basis of a plagiarised dissertation.

On 7 February 2017, the Seoul Northern District Court returned a guilty verdict for embezzling 378 million won from school funds. She served nine days in prison before posting bail of 50 million won on 20 February. In response to the ruling, Shim's husband resigned from his position on the campaign team for presidential candidate Moon Jae-in, claiming that, if his wife was corrupt, he, "would shoot her with a pistol."

Bibliography

References

1956 births
Sungshin Women's University alumni
Konkuk University alumni
Living people
People from Seoul
South Korean women academics
People convicted of embezzlement
South Korean fraudsters